Boussouma is a town in the Boussouma Department of Sanmatenga Province in northern-central Burkina Faso. .

References

External links
Satellite map at Maplandia.com

Populated places in the Centre-Nord Region
Bam Province